Tochukwu Nnourge (born 15 July 1995) is a Nigerian volleyball player who plays in the Nigeria Customs team and the Nigeria women's national volleyball team.

She is the captain of the Nigeria Customs Team.

Life
Ikhiede was born in Asaba in 1995.

Achievements
Ikhiede plays in Beach volleyball "b" team for the Nigeria women's national volleyball team.

At the beginning of 2019 she was in Yaoundé in Cameroon where she and Francisca Ikhiede won the gold medal at the Camtel International Beach Volleyball Championship.

She was part of the team that represented Africa at the 2019 FIVB Snow Volleyball World Tour in Bariloche, Rio Negro Argentina. She alongside her teammates beat the Host Argentina in their opening game 2-1 (13-15, 15–11, 15–11).

She was part of the team that represented Nigeria at the 2019 maiden edition of the World Beach Volleyball Championship in Hamburg, Germany.

The Nigerian team were runners up when Kenya qualified for the postponed 2020 Summer Olympics.

She was part of the Nigeria Customs team that retained the 2021 President Beach Volleyball cup in Kaduna alongside her partner Francisca Ikhiede.

References

Nigerian women's volleyball players
1995 births
Living people